The St Petersburg school for the Deaf (Санкт-Петербургское училище глухонемых) was a school for the deaf in Saint Petersburg in Russia between 1806 and 1918. It was the first school for the deaf in Russia and as such a pioneer institution. It was founded by empress Maria and a part of the Office of the Institutions of Empress Maria.

References
 Басова А. Г., Егоров С. Ф. История сурдопедагогики: Учеб. пособие для студентов дефектол. фак. пед. ин-тов. —— М.: Просвещение, 1984. — 295 с., ил

1806 establishments in the Russian Empire
1918 disestablishments in Russia
19th century in Saint Petersburg
Schools in Saint Petersburg
Educational institutions established in 1806
Cultural heritage monuments of federal significance in Saint Petersburg